Azmak Creek is a creek in Turkey. It is in Ula ilçe (district) of Muğla Province.

It is a short creek.
The creek is situated to the east of Akyaka a town known for its touristic potential. During summers there are regular excursion boat trips in the creek. Annually, the number of passengers is about a million  The fauna of the creek includes fresh water turtle and Eurasian otter.

References

Landforms of Muğla Province
Ula District
Rivers of Turkey
Tourist attractions in Muğla Province